Pope Adrian IV (r. 1154–59) created 23 cardinals in three consistories held during his pontificate. This included his future successor Pope Gregory VIII in 1155.

December 1155
 Ubaldo
 Giovanni Pizzuti Can. Reg.
 Giovanni
 Boso O.S.B.
 Ardicio Rivoltella
 Bonadies de Bonadie
 Alberto di Morra Can. Reg.
 Guglielmo Matengo O.Cist.
 Guido

February 1158
There are conflicting sources that suggest this allocation was either elevated in this month or in March.
 Cinzio Papareschi
 Pietro di Miso
 Raymond des Arènes
 Giovanni Conti
 Simone O.S.B.

February 1159
 Gualterio
 Pietro
 Giovanni
 Jacopo
 Gerardo
 Uberto
 Gregorio
 Guido
 Romano

Notes and references

Sources

College of Cardinals
Adrian IV
12th-century cardinals
12th-century Catholicism
Pope Adrian IV